The women's 1500 metres event at the 2006 African Championships in Athletics was held at the Stade Germain Comarmond on August 11.

Results

References
Results 

2006 African Championships in Athletics
1500 metres at the African Championships in Athletics
2006 in women's athletics